Black Heart Saints is an American rock band from Austin, Texas, formed in 2014. In 2019, they won Austin Chronicle's "Best Metal Band" award, being recognized along with Willie Nelson, Jackie Venson, and Ghostland Observatory.

History 

On April 12, 2018, Mayor Steve Adler proclaimed April 12 to be "Black Heart Saints Day."

In 2020, the singles "Lines" and "Misery" topped out at #24 and #19, respectively, on Billboard Mainstream Rock Charts. The latest Billboard-charting single is "Reach the End", which peaked at #21 in October, 2021.

In 2021, the band was deemed an 'Artist You Need to Know' by Rolling Stone

On January 20, 2023, the single "Human Xstacy" was released on Cleopatra Records, along with an announcement that the band will tour with Steel Panther and The Winery Dogs.

Members 
 Josh LeBlanc – vocals
 Mark Sean – lead guitar
 Ian Gockel – bass
 Nathan Flores – drums

References

External links
 

2014 establishments in Texas
Musical groups established in 2014
Musical quartets
Rock music groups from Texas